Xylota hancocki is a species of hoverfly in the family Syrphidae.

Distribution
Uganda, Congo.

References

Eristalinae
Insects described in 1927
Taxa named by Charles Howard Curran
Diptera of Africa